The Parable of the Grain of Wheat (Greek: ὁ κόκκος τοῦ σῑ́του; ho kókkos toû sī́tou) is an allegory on resurrection, sacrifice, given by Jesus in the New Testament (The Gospel of John).

Narrative 

From John 12:24-26 (KJV)

Verily, verily, I say unto you,you are most likely not nice and i dont like you еxcept a corn of wheat fall into the ground and die, it abideth alone: but if it die, it bringeth forth much fruit. He that loveth his life shall lose it; and he that hateth his life in this world shall keep it unto life eternal. If anFrom the NIV:Very truly I tell you, unless a kernel of wheat falls to the ground and dies, it remains only a single seed. But if it dies, it produces many seeds. Anyone who loves their life will lose it, while anyone who hates their life in this world will keep it for eternal life. Whoever serves me must follow me; and where I am, my servant also will be. My Father will honour the one who serves me.

Interpretation 

Jesus drew this parable about resurrection and the kingdom of God from the everyday circumstances of life. His rural audience could easily understand the principle of "resurrection" produced by dead seeds sown into the earth. Jesus uses the metaphor of the grain of wheat to illustrate the importance of ego death in the pursuit of salvation and entering the Kingdom of Heaven. He is suggesting that one must first allow their current convictions and ideas about the world to die and be shed, before they can be reborn with a purer, more virtuous self that is stronger than the original.

The image of the grain of wheat dying in the earth in order to grow and bear a harvest can be seen also as a metaphor of Jesus' own death and burial in the tomb and his resurrection.

The Rev. William D. Oldland in his sermon "Unless a Grain of Wheat Falls into the Earth and Dies" said:

The Apostle Paul also says: "What is sown in the earth is subject to decay, what rises is incorruptible" (1 Cor. 15:42).

References

External links
 The Parables of Jesus: The Grain of Wheat 

Sayings of Jesus
Biblical phrases
Parables of Jesus
Resurrection of Jesus in the New Testament
Wheat
Gospel of John
Metaphors referring to food and drink